Mohamed Botan was a Somali rebel leader, formerly based in Mogadishu, and a former member of the Somali Transitional Government, in which he was minister for the disarmament of militias. He was also a member of the Alliance for the Restoration of Peace and Counter-Terrorism (ARPCT), a group of warlords opposed to the Islamic Court Union and allegedly financed by the United States.

He was sacked by the Interim transitional government on May 24, 2006, along with Mohamed Qanyare,  Muse Sudi and Omar Finish. On June 3, his militia surrendered to the Rahanweyn Resistance Army, four days after they were defeated in clashes in northeast Mogadishu. He left for Baidoa, seat of the transitional government.

External links 
 STG president Abdullahi Yusuf has warned his ministers that they cannot continue to serve in his government while leading militias into battle
 Somali PM Plans to Fire Two of His Cabinet
 Four Somalia Government Ministers Resign
 New power emerges from the south

Year of birth missing (living people)
Living people
Somalian faction leaders
Government ministers of Somalia